Sir Ronald Ian Campbell  (7 June 1890 – 22 April 1983) was a British diplomat.

Campbell was the second son of Sir Guy Campbell, 3rd Baronet (see Campbell baronets), and Nina, daughter of Frederick Lehmann. He was educated at Eton and graduated from Magdalen College, Oxford, in 1912 with a Bachelor of Arts. In 1939, Campbell was appointed Envoy Extraordinary and Minister Plenipotentiary to the Kingdom of Yugoslavia, a post he held until 1941 when he became Envoy Extraordinary and Minister Plenipotentiary (deputy head of mission) at Washington, D.C., until 1944. He became Assistant Under-Secretary of State at the Foreign Office in 1945, and served as the United Kingdom's ambassador to Egypt from 1946 to 1950. He was invested as a Privy Counsellor in 1950.

References
General

Specific

External links
Photographs

 

1890 births
1983 deaths
People educated at Eton College
Alumni of Magdalen College, Oxford
Ambassadors of the United Kingdom to Yugoslavia
Ambassadors of the United Kingdom to Egypt
Companions of the Order of the Bath
Knights Grand Cross of the Order of St Michael and St George
Members of the Privy Council of the United Kingdom
Younger sons of baronets